Belen is an unincorporated community in Quitman County, Mississippi. Belen is located on Mississippi Highway 316, west of Marks.

History
Delma Furniss (1934-2022), American politician, was born in Belen.

References

Unincorporated communities in Quitman County, Mississippi
Unincorporated communities in Mississippi